John Beagley (born 23 March 1933) is an Australian cricketer. He played eighteen first-class matches for South Australia between 1956 and 1960.

See also
 List of South Australian representative cricketers

References

External links
 

1933 births
Living people
Australian cricketers
South Australia cricketers
Cricketers from Adelaide